Phil or Philip Gordon may refer to:

Phil Gordon (actor) (1916–2010), American character actor and dialect coach
Phil Gordon (poker player) (born 1970), American poker player
Phil Gordon (politician) (born 1951), ex-mayor of Phoenix, Arizona
Philip Gordon (born 1962), American government official
Philip B. Gordon (1885–1948), American Indian Catholic priest